Kent Bede Bernard (born 27 May 1942) is a Trinidadian athlete who competed mainly in the 400 metres.

He competed for Trinidad and Tobago in the 1964 Summer Olympics held in Tokyo, Japan in the 4 x 400 metre relay where he won the bronze medal with his teammates Edwin Skinner, Edwin Roberts and Wendell Mottley.

References

 Sports Reference

Trinidad and Tobago male sprinters
Olympic bronze medalists for Trinidad and Tobago
Athletes (track and field) at the 1964 Summer Olympics
Olympic athletes of Trinidad and Tobago
Athletes (track and field) at the 1966 British Empire and Commonwealth Games
Athletes (track and field) at the 1970 British Commonwealth Games
Commonwealth Games gold medallists for Trinidad and Tobago
Commonwealth Games silver medallists for Trinidad and Tobago
Athletes (track and field) at the 1971 Pan American Games
1942 births
Living people
Commonwealth Games medallists in athletics
Michigan Wolverines men's track and field athletes
Medalists at the 1964 Summer Olympics
Olympic bronze medalists in athletics (track and field)
Pan American Games medalists in athletics (track and field)
Pan American Games bronze medalists for Trinidad and Tobago
Medalists at the 1971 Pan American Games
Medallists at the 1966 British Empire and Commonwealth Games